Veysi (also Romanized as Veysī) is a village in Aghili-ye Jonubi Rural District, Aghili District, Gotvand County, Khuzestan Province, Iran. At the 2006 census, its population was 389, in 92 families, in 78 houses

References 

Populated places in Gotvand County